Phyllonorycter alluaudiella is a moth of the family Gracillariidae. It is known from Morocco.

References

alluaudiella
Endemic fauna of Morocco
Moths described in 1922
Moths of Africa